The women's 100 metre breaststroke at the 2009 IPC Swimming European Championships was held at Laugardalslaug in Reykjavik from 18–24 October.

Medalists

See also
List of IPC world records in swimming

References

breaststroke 100 m women
2009 in women's swimming